Topolog is a commune in Tulcea County, Northern Dobruja, Romania. It is composed of seven villages: Calfa, Cerbu (historical name:Hagiomer), Făgărașu Nou, Luminița (historical names: Rum Ali, Urumbei - until 1925, Regina Elisabeta - until 1948, Elena Pavel - until 1964), Măgurele, Sâmbăta Nouă and Topolog.

Făgărașu Nou (“New Făgăraș”) was founded around 1880 by Mihai Popa Radu, a former captain in the Austro-Hungarian Army. Naming the new village after his hometown, he brought along seventeen families from Transylvania, part of a broader migration of Mocani.

Notes

References
Lavinia Dacia Gheorghe, “Personalități mocane în județul Constanța (secolul XIX - începutul secolului XX)”, in Acta Musei Porolissensis, vol. XXXI-XXXII/2010, pp. 71-86

Communes in Tulcea County
Localities in Northern Dobruja